Each team can register a squad of 21 players (three of whom must be goalkeepers).

Players marked in boldface have been capped at full international level.

Group A

Guinea
Head Coach: Hamidou Camara

Niger
Head Coach:  Francisco Castaño Benito

Nigeria
Head Coach: Emmanuel Amuneke

Zambia
Head Coach: Chris Kaunda

Group B

Cameroon
Head Coach: Joseph Atangana

Ivory Coast
Head Coach: Soualiho Haidara

Mali
Head Coach: Baye Ba

South Africa
Head Coach: Molefi Petrus Ntseki

References 

2015 African U-17 Championship